is the fourth single by Japanese idol group Idoling. It was released both as a normal edition and a limited edition CD + DVD. The normal edition contains in special trading cards in each copy, and the limited edition contains a DVD with live footage and behind-the-scenes filming. Its highest Oricon weekly chart position was #5, and it reached #3 on the December 1 daily chart. Track 2, Tokimeki DREAMing!!! was used as the image song for ROBO_JAPAN 2008, while track 3, Lemon Drop, was used as the ending song for the movie Pyokotan Profile.

Track listings

CD

DVD

External links
 Pony Canyon - "Shokugyō: Idol." (Limited Edition) : Idoling!!!
 Pony Canyon - "Shokugyō: Idol." : Idoling!!!

2008 singles
Idoling!!! songs
2008 songs
Pony Canyon singles
Japanese film songs
Song articles with missing songwriters